Brian Saffery-Cooper (born 9 July 1934) is a British sailor. He competed in the Finn event at the 1964 Summer Olympics.

References

External links
 

1934 births
Living people
British male sailors (sport)
Olympic sailors of Great Britain
Sailors at the 1964 Summer Olympics – Finn
Place of birth missing (living people)